Jamie Prebble (born 28 May 1991) is a New Zealand freestyle skier, specialising in ski cross competitions. He won the silver medal in the ski cross at the 2017 FIS Freestyle World Ski Championships.

On 24 October 2017, he was selected to compete for New Zealand at the 2018 Winter Olympics in Pyeongchang, South Korea.

International competitions

References

External links
FIS-Ski profile
Snow Sports NZ profile

1991 births
Living people
New Zealand male freestyle skiers
Freestyle skiers at the 2018 Winter Olympics
Olympic freestyle skiers of New Zealand